The 1981 Intercontinental Cup was held in Canada. Eight teams competed in the tournament which was won by the United States national baseball team.

Intercontinental Cup (baseball)
Intercontinental Cup
1981
Intercontinental Cup (baseball)